Swing Shift is the fifth studio album by the Canadian guitarist Rik Emmett, released in 1997. It is the second installment in the guitar trilogy, released merely six months after Ten Invitations from the Mistress of Mr. E, which was the beginning of the trilogy that is meant to cover the basis of Emmett's guitar teaching.

Track listing

All songs written by Rik Emmett

 "Taste of Steel" – 2:19 (contains lead vocals)
 "Way Cool" – 3:49
 "Swing Shift" – 3:42
 "Three Clouds Across the Moon" – 5:45
 "Santa Fe Horizon" – 5:47
 "Swizzle Stick" – 4:19
 "Gladhands" – 1:28
 "One Look" – 4:30 (contains lead vocals)
 "Key Chain" – 3:37
 "Veronica's Blue Waltz" – 5:15
 "Mr. Bebop" – 1:54 (contains lead vocals)
 "A Theory of Relativity" – 2:42

Personnel
 Rik Emmett – guitars, synthesizers, vocals
 Steve Skingley – bass
 Denton Young – drums
 Randy Cooke – percussion
 Marty Anderson – keyboards

Production
 Rik Emmett producer
 Tony Daniels engineer

References

External links
 Swing Shift Entry at the Official Rik Emmett Homepage DEAD LINK

Rik Emmett albums
1997 albums
Open House Records albums